Stora Levene is a locality situated in Vara Municipality, Västra Götaland County, Sweden with 761 inhabitants in 2010.

According to a regnal list appended to the Westrogothic law, two Swedish kings in the 11th century, Håkan the Red and Stenkil, came from Levene. The church, in the church village on the outskirts of the modern village, is from the 13th century, and holds the grave of the 17th century landshövding Johan Henriksson Reuter. During a renovation in 1927, a runestone was found built into the church wall. Known as Levenstenen ('the Levene stone'), it is Sweden's tallest runestone.

References 

Populated places in Västra Götaland County
Populated places in Vara Municipality